George Smith was an American politician who served as a Democrat mayor of Easton, Pennsylvania for two terms between 1960 and 1968. He also served on the Easton City Council from 1975 until his death in 1986 at the age of 79.

Early life

An Easton native, Smith was born to Bernard and Catherine Née Tobin. He graduated from the Easton High school in 1924. He graduated from Muhlenberg College in 1928 and got a medical degree from the University of Pennsylvania.

Career

Physician

Smith opened a medical practice in Easton in 1933. During World War II Smith served as a Major in the United States Army Medical Corps. He would operate his medical practice until he retired in 1960 when he was elected mayor.

Mayor of Easton

First elected in 1960, mayor Smith was the last mayor of Easton under its weak mayor system. This meant that the office of mayor was mostly a ceremonial office as they had no ability to vote in council meetings or participate in local government. Despite this he would go on to win re-election in 1964 and would decline to run for a third term despite there being no term limits for the office.

Easton City Council

Following his departure from the office of mayor, Smith served as director of the Bi-City Health Board for Allentown and Bethlehem from 1968 to 1974. He would be elected as a city councilmen in 1975. He would be re-elected in 1979 and 1983 and had plans to stand for election again in 1987. Described as "astute" and "honest" he headed council's public works committee, was vice-chairman of the planning and development committee, and had served as council president in 1978 and 1979. After a year in and out of the hospital, Smith died in office in 1986 at the age of 79.

Legacy

Smith was well liked by the other city councilors and then mayor Salvatore J. Panto, Jr. ordered city hall to fly its flag at half mast and have black bunting draped the front door of City Hall in mourning. Panto also described Smith as a roll model of his, and someone whose experience "behind the desk" was invaluable during his early tenure as mayor. The Pennsylvania General Assembly passed an act to rename the Third Street Bridge to the Dr. George S. Smith Memorial Bridge on 5 December 1988.

Personal life

A Roman Catholic, Smith married Theresa Née Frace who pre-deceased him in 1980. He had three sons, all of which followed in his footsteps to become doctors, George S. Smith Jr., Paul H. Smith and Stanley B. Smith as well as a daughter Marie Williams. He had two brothers, Arthur and James Smith and fourteen grandchildren and one great-grandson.

References

Mayors of Easton, Pennsylvania
Muhlenberg College alumni
University of Pennsylvania alumni
Pennsylvania Democrats
1907 births
1986 deaths